Henryk Kaczorowski (10 July 1888 - 6 May 1942) was the rector of the Higher Theological Seminary in Włocławek who was murded by the Nazis. Beatified in 1999, he is one of the 108 Blessed Polish Martyrs.

References 

1888 births
1942 deaths
Polish civilians killed in World War II
Beatifications by Pope John Paul II
108 Blessed Polish Martyrs